David Richardson (born 18 August 1987) is a British former competitive figure skater. He is the 2011 British national champion and 2013 Golden Bear of Zagreb champion. He qualified for the free skate at the 2012 World Junior Championships in Ljubljana, Slovenia, where he finished 23rd overall.

Richardson trained at the NIC Nottingham. He last competed in the 2013–14 season.

Programs

Results 
JGP: Junior Grand Prix

References

External links

 

British male single skaters
English male single skaters
Figure skaters at the 2007 Winter Universiade
1987 births
Living people
Sportspeople from Newcastle upon Tyne